Peter Killian Gallagher (born August 19, 1955) is an American actor. Since 1980, he has played roles in numerous Hollywood films. He is best known for starring as Sandy Cohen in the television drama series The O.C. from 2003 to 2007, recurring roles such as Deputy Chief William Dodds on Law & Order: Special Victims Unit,   Stacey Koons on the Showtime comedy-drama Californication, Nick on the Netflix series Grace & Frankie, and Chuck Cedar in Mr. Deeds. He also played CIA Director of Clandestine Services (DCS) Arthur Campbell on Covert Affairs.

Early life 
Gallagher was born in New York City. His mother, Mary Ann (née O'Shea), was a bacteriologist, and his father, Thomas Francis Gallagher, Jr., was an advertising executive. Gallagher is the youngest of their three children. He is of Irish Catholic background and was raised in Armonk, New York. Gallagher graduated from Tufts University, where he was active in theater, appearing in such shows as Stephen Sondheim's Company and singing with the all-male a cappella group the Beelzebubs. He studied acting at the William Esper Studio.

Career 
Gallagher appeared on Broadway with Glenn Close in Tom Stoppard's The Real Thing and made his feature film debut in the Taylor Hackford film The Idolmaker, but first achieved fame for his role in Steven Soderbergh's sex, lies, and videotape (1989). He also starred as Sky Masterson in the 1992 Broadway hit revival of Guys and Dolls.

Gallagher played a potential career threat to Tim Robbins's studio executive in The Player (1992); the comatose fiancé of Sandra Bullock in While You Were Sleeping (1995); a real estate salesman having an affair with Annette Bening in American Beauty (1999); a media executive in Mr. Deeds (2002); and a political reporter exposing media ethics during a presidential debate in The Last Debate.

From 2003 to 2007, Gallagher starred as Sandy Cohen, a Jewish public defender and corporate lawyer, on the Fox television show The O.C.. He hosts an annual award ceremony named "The Sandy Cohen Awards" or The Sandys, which, in honor of his character on The O.C., gives a scholarship to a law school student at UC Berkeley who wants to become a public defender.

Gallagher released an album titled 7 Days in Memphis in 2005, on the Sony BMG label. This includes a studio recording of his performance of "Don't Give Up On Me" (originally by Solomon Burke), which was featured in an episode of The O.C. He also has a video for his single "Still I Long For Your Kiss", in which he starred with his TV-wife Kelly Rowan.

In 2005, Gallagher received the P.T. Barnum Award from Tufts University for his exceptional work in the field of media and entertainment. In 2007, Gallagher received the "Light on the Hill" award at Tufts University. The award is given to notable alumni from Tufts who have demonstrated ambition, achievement, and active citizenship.

From February 13 through July 5, 2015, Gallagher starred on Broadway in On the Twentieth Century although he missed several performances in late February due to illness.

In 2020 Gallagher played Mitch Clarke, who had Progressive supranuclear palsy, in a regular role in the first season of Zoey's Extraordinary Playlist. Though his character died in the season 1 finale, Gallagher appeared in several episodes of the second season and the Christmas special Zoey's Extraordinary Christmas.

In 2021, Gallagher took part in the television series Grey's Anatomy as Dr. David Hamilton.

From 2018 through 2022, Gallagher appeared in 4 seasons of the Netflix series Grace and Frankie as Nick, the husband of Jane Fonda's character Grace.

Personal life 
Gallagher is married to Paula Harwood and has two children, James and Kathryn. His daughter Kathryn is an actress and singer.

Filmography

Film

Television films

Television series

Stage credits

References

External links 

 
 
 

20th-century American male actors
21st-century American male actors
Male actors from New York (state)
American male film actors
American male musical theatre actors
American male stage actors
American male television actors
American people of Irish descent
Outstanding Performance by a Cast in a Motion Picture Screen Actors Guild Award winners
People from Armonk, New York
Tufts University alumni
1955 births
Living people
Volpi Cup winners